Little Devil Inside is an upcoming action-adventure video game developed and published by Neostream Interactive. The game's single-player and co-operative multiplayer modes both follow the professional and personal lives of explorers searching for monsters & supernatural events in a 19th-century-inspired world. It is planned for initial release on Microsoft Windows, PlayStation 4 and PlayStation 5, and will be followed by Nintendo Switch and Xbox One shortly after.

Gameplay

Core gameplay 
Little Devil Inside is a third-person 3D action-adventure role-playing video game with elements of survival, combat, and open-world exploration; however, its developers, Neostream Interactive, have described the game's survival elements as "rather easy" compared to other games in the survival genre, stating that the game is "not about how long you can survive in a certain environment", instead being about "taking a trip for a mission, and surviving during the process." Examples of in-game survival elements include harvesting water from cacti, chopping wood to make a fire, and cooking food obtained from hunting. Players can use a variety of weapons and tools to survive and accomplish their objectives, such as a sword, shield, gun, grappling hook, bombs, tent, and cooking equipment.

The game takes places across multiple locations with differing environmental conditions, including desert, snow, forest, mountains, swampland, and deep-sea diving. These areas are connected by a "world map", which uses tilt-shift effects to create the appearance of miniature scale. Although this overall map is available, players cannot "fast forward" their travel to these locations; instead, they must take direct control of their transportation during the journey and respond to events that occur on the way, such as encounters with NPCs, overcoming obstacles (such as a flock of sheep), or being ambushed by enemies. Players also have the ability to upgrade their transportation (alongside their weapons and armor) as the game progresses.

Between missions, players can return to the safety of the game's home town to rest and prepare for further adventures (such as talking with NPCs, gathering information on the next location through library research, and preparing for its weather conditions). According to Neostream, this preparation is key to further success:"You will need to prepare for any unexpected encounters with the weather, have the necessary intel about the region, equip your gear as you see fit, get on a vehicle and react to unexpected events that arise during your journey ... Depending on how you prepare for the mission and how you react and respond to events will determine how easily or hard you can achieve the missions."

The game also includes roguelike gameplay elements: In the event of a player's character dying, that character cannot be resurrected; however, the player can take subsequent characters to that same location in order to recover any lost equipment.

Visual style 
The game leans towards a minimalist visual style, with only a minimal user interface and avoidance of menus wherever possible, instead requiring players to ascertain details by observing visual cues and communicating with their character. For example, characters will begin to limp if they are hurt, cough if they become sick, or shiver if they become too cold. Similarly, although the various characters available to players will have different traits and stats (e.g. boastful characters hiding when they are injured, female-obsessed characters having narrower vision), these will not be explicitly displayed to the player, instead requiring them to be deduced.

Neostream have provided the following description of the game's graphical style:"As opposed to developing fully life-like, high polygon characters and objects with intense level of textures, the intended design essence and aesthetics is to create a subtle but powerful sense of emptiness for each player to fill for themselves throughout the game experience."

Co-operative multiplayer 
The game also supports co-operative multiplayer (including local multiplayer), where more than one player participates in the same mission. Additionally, the game features the possibility of random encounters between players.

Plot 
Little Devil Inside takes place in a 19th-century, Victorian-inspired setting, with elements of steampunk. The developers describe it as a "surreal, unrealistic world ... somewhere between heaven and hell." The main character, Billy, is a swordsman, employed by a research team (led by college professor Vincent and his colleague, Dr. Oliver) to travel the world in search of the supernatural and other unusual incidents. The ultimate objective set out by the researchers is to assemble a complete encyclopaedia of "all phenomenal existence."

The game also takes a satirical angle on the video game cliché of hunting monsters for financial reward by also exploring the more mundane aspects of such characters' lives and their financial inequality with their employers. In the words of Neostream:"This game is not just about killing arch-demons and saving the world. Take in the atmosphere and live a realistic life in an unrealistic world. This is a game that tells stories about people with ‘unusual’ jobs such as hunting monsters and what happens in their everyday life doing so."

Development and release 
Little Devil Inside was originally conceived by its creative director, Kody Lee, and was developed as the first game by Seoul's Neostream Interactive, who initially began in 1998 as a multimedia design & production company. Development began originally using the Unity Engine, then later switched to the Unreal Engine by Epic Games. The game was first announced through a Kickstarter campaign in April 2015, alongside a pre-alpha trailer and gameplay footage, and an entry on Steam Greenlight. At the time of the original campaign, the game had an approximate release window of "Fall 2016." Backed by over 5,000 people, the Kickstarter campaign raised  by its completion in May 2015. Subsequently, the game's original release window was pushed back, due to an increase in its scope.

In December 2017, the developers released a new trailer for the game, and began communicating a planned release date of "late 2018," with PC planned as the first release platform; however, that window passed without the game being released.

The game's original campaign stated that it was planned for release on Steam platforms (Windows, macOS, and Linux), PlayStation 4, and Xbox One, with Nintendo's Wii U console added later as a stretch goal; however, during the PlayStation 5 reveal event in June 2020, it was announced that Little Devil Inside would be a timed console exclusive for the PlayStation 4 and PlayStation 5. In a subsequent message to their Kickstarter backers, Neostream announced that they plan to release concurrently with PC as part of their agreement with Sony; however no mention was made of Xbox or Nintendo platform releases. A later website update for the game confirmed a planned release for Windows, and that releases for Nintendo Switch (replacing that of the Wii U) and Xbox One were still planned for once the PlayStation exclusivity period expires.

During the CES trade show in January 2021, a presentation made by Sony included a footnote that Little Devil Inside was planned for release in July 2021; however, Sony subsequently removed this release date (and those for other games) from the presentation without comment, and the game was not released within that period.

As announced by Sony via Twitter on the preceding day, their "State of Play" livestream event on 27 October, featured the "first in-depth look" at Little Devil Inside. The new footage highlighted elements such as the game's world map, and displayed a release date of 2022. This release date was further refined in December 2021 when an Instagram post from PlayStation showed teaser footage of the game with a footnote of "Releasing Winter 2022." However, the release was delayed until further notice.

References

External links

Little Devil Inside on Kickstarter
Little Devil Inside on Steam Greenlight

Upcoming video games
PlayStation 4 games
PlayStation 5 games
Single-player video games
Action-adventure games
Role-playing video games
Video games developed in South Korea
Kickstarter-funded video games
Nintendo Switch games
Unreal Engine games
Windows games
Video games about demons
Xbox One games